For the 1964 Vuelta a España, the field consisted of 80 riders; 49 finished the race.

By rider

By nationality

References

1964 Vuelta a España
1964